The 2007 Los Angeles Angels of Anaheim season was the franchise's 47th season since inception. The regular season ended with a record of 94–68 and the Angels winning the American League West division title for the sixth time. However, the Angels' playoff run quickly ended, as they were swept by the Boston Red Sox in the American League Division Series, just as they were in 2004.

Offseason
During the offseason, the Angels released Adam Kennedy and Darin Erstad, two of the few players remaining from their 2002 World Series championship team, forcing the Angels to rely on their rookies and younger veterans for the early part of the season.  In November, they signed former Texas Rangers center fielder Gary Matthews, Jr. to a 5-year contract worth $50 million.  Outfielder Juan Rivera broke a leg playing winter baseball in the Venezuelan winter league, leading the Angels to sign free agent Shea Hillenbrand.  The Angels solidified their bullpen for the 2007 season by re-signing set-up man Scot Shields and closer Francisco Rodríguez each to one-year contracts and acquiring Justin Speier and Darren Oliver via free agency.

Late in spring training, third baseman Chone Figgins fractured his finger, putting him out of action for the first month of the season.  This unexpected injury led Maicer Izturis to claim the start at third base entering the season.

Regular season

Season summary

April
The Angels' season began with a three-game sweep of the Rangers at home, a series which saw the Angels outscore the Rangers 17–7.  The Angels continued their 7-game homestand with a four-game series split with the Athletics.  With a solid record of 5–2 and first place in the division after the first week of the season, the Angels traveled onto the road to take on the Indians.  However, the Indians' previous four-game series with the Mariners was postponed because of heavy snow in Cleveland, Ohio.

The large amount of snow that had fallen upon Jacobs Field brought about the discussion of moving the series to a city with better field conditions.  After a discussion about possibly moving the series to Anaheim, the Indians decided to move the three-game series to the roofed Miller Park in Milwaukee, Wisconsin, home of the Milwaukee Brewers.

The Indians took the three-game series 2 games to 1.  The Angels continued their road trip by being swept by the Red Sox in a three-game series and the Athletics in a two-game series, dropping the Angels to a 6–9 record.  During the game against the Athletics on April 18, second baseman Howie Kendrick was hit by a pitch, and placed on the 15-day disabled list.  Kendrick would eventually return to the team in mid-May.

The Angels returned home and swept the Mariners in a three-game series, split a two-game series with the Detroit Tigers, and swept the Devil Rays in a two-game series that saw the Angels outscore the Devil Rays 20–4.  After losing the first game on a new roadtrip to the White Sox, the Angels won their final three games of the month, including one to the Royals.

May
May began with the Angels extending their winning streak to four games with a victory over the Royals.  However, the Royals salvaged a series split by winning the last two games of the four-game series.  The Angels returned home to greet the White Sox, but the White Sox were rewarded with a series win, winning two of three games.  The Angels dropped their third game in a row when they lost the series opener to the Indians.  But good pitching and good defense guided the Angels to winning the final two games of the series by a combined score of 11–2, including an 8–0 victory behind Kelvim Escobar's shutout.

The Angels went to Texas to take three of four games against the Rangers.  Then, they went into Seattle to take on the Mariners.  The Mariners' offense lit up Kelvim Escobar and the Angels lost 11–3.  But the Angels took the final two games of their series against the Mariners.

The Angels returned to Anaheim to begin a Freeway Series with the Dodgers.  The three-game series saw the Angels sweep their crosstown rivals, outscoring the Dodgers 19–4.  The series also set an Angels record in attendance.  The three-game series averaged 44,341 fans, an Angel Stadium record for highest average attendance for a three-game series since the stadium was renovated in 1998.  The Angels' short homestand ended and the Angels headed out on the road again to begin a three-game series with the defending World Series runners-up, the Tigers.

The Angels won the series opener to extend their winning streak to a season-high six games, in which the Angels outscored their opponents 37–10.  However, the Tigers won the final two games, and the series.  The Angels then went to New York to begin a three-game series with the Yankees.  The Angels, entering the season as the only American League team with a winning record against the Yankees in the Joe Torre-era at 55–52,  added to their win total with a three-game series sweep, in which the Yankees were outscored 17–10.  The Angels ended the month by taking two of three against the Mariners and losing the first game of a four-game series with the Orioles.  The final game of the month, a 4–3 come-from-behind victory, saw Angels' John Lackey become the first Major League pitcher to win his 8th game of the season.

June
The Angels continued their trend of winning the first game of the month when they beat the Orioles with a 3–2 comeback win.  John Lackey became the first Major League pitcher in 2007 to win his 9th game of the season.  The Angels won the remaining two games of the series and began a three-game series with the Twins with an offensive explosion, scoring season-highs in runs (16), hits (23), runs in an inning (8 in the 8th), and home runs (4), as the Angels beat the Twins 16–3.  The Angels split the final two games of the series before leaving to finish interleague play.

The Angels went on the road to face the 2006 World Series champion Cardinals.  After falling behind 4–0 early in the game, the Angels offense exploded for 10 runs in a 10–6 victory.  The Angels split the remaining two games of the series and continued their roadtrip against the Reds.  Kelvim Escobar striking out a career-high 14 batters in the series opener, but the Angels lost, 5–3.  The loss gave the Angels their first two-game losing streak since May 23–24.  John Lackey became the first Major League pitcher to win his 10th game of the season and Francisco Rodríguez became the first closer in the American League to earn his 20th save of the season in the second game of the series, which the Angels won 6–3.  In the final game of the series, the Angels scored 6 runs in the 7th inning to fuel the offense to a 9–7 victory.

The Angels came back home, but went to Dodger Stadium to complete their Freeway Series with the Dodgers.  Ervin Santana pitched 7 strong innings, allowing only two runs; however, Santana was outdueled by Dodgers' pitcher Derek Lowe, who struck out a career-high 11 batters in 7 innings.  The Dodgers took game one of the three-game series 2–1.  Jered Weaver won his 5th consecutive decision in a costly effort; Weaver jammed his shoulder sliding into 2nd base, Garret Anderson injured his right hip and was placed on the 15-day disabled list after the game, and Casey Kotchman suffered a concussion when a pickoff throw hit him in the helmet.  Weaver's sixth win of the season gave the Angels' starters 38 wins on the season, which led the league.  Kelvim Escobar struck out 8 batters and only gave up three runs in seven innings.  Gary Matthews, Jr. hit his first career inside-the-park home run and the Angels won the final game 10–4.  The paid attendance for all three games of the series was 56,000, the overall capacity of Dodger Stadium.  This marked the first time in Dodger Stadium history that this mark was set.

The Angels returned home to begin an interleague series with the Houston Astros.  Chone Figgins had a career night in the series opener.  Figgins went 6-for-6, becoming the second player in team history to go 6-for-6; outfielder Garret Anderson accomplished this feat in 1996.  Figgins also became the first player in Major League history to go 6-for-6 with a walk-off hit in a 9-inning game.  The Angels trailed 9–4 going into the bottom of the 7th inning, where they scored 5 runs, capped off by Figgins' 5th hit of the night, an infield single.  In the 9th inning, Figgins drove in Reggie Willits with an RBI triple to win the game 10–9.  The Astros continued their incredible offense and took the second game.  Recent call-up Terry Evans hit his first Major League home run in his first home at-bat, but the Angels trailed until the 7th inning.  Astros pitching walked 4 consecutive Angels batters, tying up the score, before Vladimir Guerrero hit a three-run home run.  Guerrero's home run was the Angels' only hit in a 6-run 7th inning.  The Angels held on to win the series' finale 8–4.  The Angels' 6-run inning marked the third time in a span of one week that the Angels had scored 5 or more runs in the 7th inning.

The Angels trailed 4–0 late in their series opener against the Pirates, but came from behind once again to win 5–4 in 11 innings.  In the second game, the Angels took an early lead and took the game 10–1.  The Angels blew a late-inning lead when Xavier Nady hit an RBI-single off Francisco Rodríguez to tie the game 3–3.  However, in the 10th inning Erick Aybar hit the Angels second walk-off ground-rule double in the series to win the game 4–3.  The three-game series sweep was the Angels' first since they swept the Yankees in May.  The Angels also won their 9th series in a row.

The Angels were prepared to play their first games against an American League team in three weeks, but were swept by the Royals, marking the first time in two months that the Angels were swept and the first series the Angels lost since May 4–6.  The Angels traveled to Baltimore, Maryland to begin a three-game series with the Orioles.  In the series opener, the Angels blew a 5-run lead, an Oriole rally highlighted by Aubrey Huff hitting for the cycle.  But Howie Kendrick hit a two-run home run in the 9th inning and the Angels won 9–7.  Baltimore took the second game, 6–3, and the Angels ended the month with an MLB-best 50–31 record.

July
The Angels improved to a 4–0 record in the first game of the new month with a 4–3 victory against the Orioles, taking the series.  The Angels, hoping to end the first half with a successful week, continued their road trip in Texas.  In the first game, Ervin Santana threw a career-high 11 strikeouts.  But it was all for nothing, as the highlight of the game came when the Rangers' Brad Wilkerson hit his third home run of the game, becoming the first American League player (third throughout the league) to hit three home runs in one game.  The Angels split the final two games of the series, and concluded their road trip, and the first half of the season, by taking on the New York Yankees.

Three Angels players represented the American League in the 2007 Major League Baseball All-Star Game; Vladimir Guerrero was the leading vote-getter amongst American League outfielders in fan balloting, while John Lackey and Francisco Rodríguez were selected by Jim Leyland, the American League manager for the event.  Guerrero won the Home Run Derby, and Rodriguez earned the save in the American League's 5–4 victory.

August
Guerrero did not hit a home run in a regular-season game in July, in the midst of the longest home run drought of his career.  He turned the page once August began, smashing four home runs in two games on the second and third of the month.

Season standings

Record vs. opponents

Roster

Game log

! style="background-color:#DDDDFF" width="160px" | Stadium
! style="background-color:#DDDDFF" width="71px" | Attendance
! style="background-color:#DDDDFF" width="53px" | Record
! style="background-color:#DDDDFF" width="42px" | GB
|- style="background-color:#bbffbb"
| 1 || April 2 || Rangers || 4–1 || Lackey (1–0) || Millwood (0–1) || Rodríguez (1) || Angel Stadium of Anaheim || 43,906 || 1–0 || style="background-color:#f2f2f2;" | 0
|- style="background-color:#bbffbb"
| 2 || April 3 || Rangers || 8–3 || Escobar (1–0) || Padilla (0–1) || || Angel Stadium of Anaheim || 42,463 || 2–0 || style="background-color:#f2f2f2;" | 0
|- style="background-color:#bbffbb"
| 3 || April 4 || Rangers || 5–3 || Santana (1–0) || McCarthy (0–1) || Rodríguez (2) || Angel Stadium of Anaheim || 35,701 || 3–0 || style="background-color:#bbffbb;" | +1
|- style="background-color:#ffbbbb"
| 4 || April 5 || Athletics || 4–3 || Duchscherer (1–0) || Rodríguez (0–1) || Street (1) || Angel Stadium of Anaheim || 39,234 || 3–1 || style="background-color:#bbffbb;" | +½
|- style="background-color:#bbffbb"
| 5 || April 6 || Athletics || 5–2 || Moseley (1–0) || Kennedy (0–1) || Rodríguez (3) || Angel Stadium of Anaheim || 43,534 || 4–1 || style="background-color:#bbffbb;" | +1
|- style="background-color:#bbffbb"
| 6 || April 7 || Athletics || 2–1 || Lackey (2–0) || Haren (0–2) || Shields (1) || Angel Stadium of Anaheim || 44,007 || 5–1 || style="background-color:#bbffbb;" | +1½
|- style="background-color:#ffbbbb"
| 7 || April 8 || Athletics || 2–1 || Blanton (1–0) || Escobar (1–1) || Street (2) || Angel Stadium of Anaheim || 37,783 || 5–2 || style="background-color:#bbffbb;" | +1
|- style="background-color:#ffbbbb"
| 8 || April 10 || @ Indians || 7–6 || Sabathia (2–0) || Santana (1–1) || Borowski (2) || Miller Park || 19,031 || 5–3 || style="background-color:#bbffbb;" | +1
|- style="background-color:#bbffbb"
| 9 || April 11 || @ Indians || 4–1 || Saunders (1–0) || Westbrook (0–1) || Rodríguez (4) || Miller Park || 16,375 || 6–3 || style="background-color:#bbffbb;" | +1
|- style="background-color:#ffbbbb"
| 10 || April 12 || @ Indians || 4–2 || Fultz (2–0) || Shields (0–1) || Borowski (3) || Miller Park || 17,090 || 6–4 || style="background-color:#bbffbb;" | +½
|- style="background-color:#ffbbbb"
| 11 || April 13 || @ Red Sox || 10–1 || Wakefield (1–1) || Lackey (2–1) || || Fenway Park || 35,946 || 6–5 || style="background-color:#bbffbb;" | +½
|- style="background-color:#ffbbbb"
| 12 || April 14 || @ Red Sox || 8–0 || Schilling (2–1) || Carrasco (0–1) || || Fenway Park || 36,300 || 6–6 || style="background-color:#ffbbbb;" | -½
|- style="background-color:#bbbbbb"
| || April 15 || @ Red Sox || colspan=4|Postponed (rain) Rescheduled for August 17 || Fenway Park || || 6–6 || style="background-color:#ffbbbb;" | -1
|- style="background-color:#ffbbbb"
| 13 || April 16 || @ Red Sox || 7–2 || Beckett (3–0) || Santana (1–2) || || Fenway Park || 35,424 || 6–7 || style="background-color:#ffbbbb;" | -1½
|- style="background-color:#ffbbbb"
| 14 || April 17 || @ Athletics || 4–1 || Gaudin (1–0) || Weaver (0–1) || Street (3) || McAfee Coliseum || 20,174 || 6–8 || style="background-color:#ffbbbb;" | -1½
|- style="background-color:#ffbbbb"
| 15 || April 18 || @ Athletics || 3–0 || Haren (1–2) || Lackey (2–2) || Street (4) || McAfee Coliseum || 17,322 || 6–9 || style="background-color:#ffbbbb;" | -2
|- style="background-color:#bbffbb"
| 16 || April 20 || Mariners || 8–4 || Saunders (2–0) || Batista (1–2) || Rodríguez (5) || Angel Stadium of Anaheim || 43,359 || 7–9 || style="background-color:#ffbbbb;" | -2
|- style="background-color:#bbffbb"
| 17 || April 21 || Mariners || 7–6 || Colón (1–0) || Ramírez (1–1) || Rodríguez (6) || Angel Stadium of Anaheim || 41,752 || 8–9 || style="background-color:#ffbbbb;" | -1
|- style="background-color:#bbffbb"
| 18 || April 22 || Mariners || 6–1 || Santana (2–2) || Weaver, Jeff (0–3) || || Angel Stadium of Anaheim || 43,628 || 9–9 || style="background-color:#f2f2f2;" | 0
|- style="background-color:#ffbbbb"
| 19 || April 23 || Tigers || 9–5 || Grilli (2–1) || Weaver (0–2) || || Angel Stadium of Anaheim || 40,563 || 9–10 || style="background-color:#ffbbbb;" | -1
|- style="background-color:#bbffbb"
| 20 || April 24 || Tigers || 9–8  || Moseley (2–0) || Jones (0–1) || || Angel Stadium of Anaheim || 36,055 || 10–10 || style="background-color:#ffbbbb;" | -1
|- style="background-color:#bbffbb"
| 21 || April 25 || Devil Rays || 9–1 || Lackey (3–2) || Jackson (0–3) || || Angel Stadium of Anaheim || 36,850 || 11–10 || style="background-color:#f2f2f2;" | 0
|- style="background-color:#bbffbb"
| 22 || April 26 || Devil Rays || 11–3 || Colón (2–0) || Seo (1–2) || || Angel Stadium of Anaheim || 35,597 || 12–10 || style="background-color:#bbffbb;" | +1
|- style="background-color:#ffbbbb"
| 23 || April 27 || @ White Sox || 7–3 || Contreras (2–2) || Santana (2–3) || || U.S. Cellular Field || 30,193 || 12–11 || style="background-color:#bbffbb;" | +½
|- style="background-color:#bbffbb"
| 24 || April 28 || @ White Sox || 3–0 || Weaver (1–2) || Garland (0–2) || Rodríguez (7) || U.S. Cellular Field || 38,208 || 13–11 || style="background-color:#bbffbb;" | +1
|- style="background-color:#bbffbb"
| 25 || April 29 || @ White Sox || 5–2 || Escobar (1–0) || Buehrle (2–1) || Rodríguez (8) || U.S. Cellular Field || 38,513 || 14–11 || style="background-color:#bbffbb;" | +1½
|- style="background-color:#bbffbb"
| 26 || April 30 || @ Royals || 3–1 || Lackey (4–2) || Pérez (2–3) || Rodríguez (9) || Kauffman Stadium || 10,866 || 15–11 || style="background-color:#bbffbb;" | +2

! style="background-color:#DDDDFF" width="160px" | Stadium
! style="background-color:#DDDDFF" width="71px" | Attendance
! style="background-color:#DDDDFF" width="53px" | Record
! style="background-color:#DDDDFF" width="42px" | GB
|- style="background-color:#bbffbb"
| 27 || May 1 || @ Royals || 7–5 || Colón (3–0) || Greinke (1–3) || Rodríguez (10) || Kauffman Stadium || 11,225 || 16–11 || style="background-color:#bbffbb;" | +2
|- style="background-color:#ffbbbb"
| 28 || May 2 || @ Royals || 3–1 || de la Rosa (3–2) || Santana (2–4) || Soria (4) || Kauffman Stadium || 9,697 || 16–12 || style="background-color:#bbffbb;" | +1
|- style="background-color:#ffbbbb"
| 29 || May 3 || @ Royals || 5–2 || Meche (3–1) || Weaver (1–3) ||Soria (5) || Kauffman Stadium || 12,683 || 16–13 || style="background-color:#bbffbb;" | +1
|- style="background-color:#bbffbb"
| 30 || May 4 || White Sox || 5–1 || Escobar (3–1) || Contreras (2–3) || Shields (2) || Angel Stadium of Anaheim || 44,126 || 17–13 || style="background-color:#bbffbb;" | +1
|- style="background-color:#ffbbbb"
| 31 || May 5 || White Sox || 6–3 || Garland (1–2) || Lackey (4–3) || Jenks (9) || Angel Stadium of Anaheim || 42,574 || 17–14 || style="background-color:#bbffbb;" | +1
|- style="background-color:#ffbbbb"
| 32 || May 6 || White Sox || 4–3  || Thornton (2–1) || Rodríguez (0–2) || Jenks (10) || Angel Stadium of Anaheim || 42,017 || 17–15 || style="background-color:#bbffbb;" | +1
|- style="background-color:#ffbbbb"
| 33 || May 8 || Indians || 5–1 || Lee (1–0) || Santana (2–5) || || Angel Stadium of Anaheim || 41,731 || 17–16 || style="background-color:#f2f2f2;" | 0
|- style="background-color:#bbffbb"
| 34 || May 9 || Indians || 3–2 || Moseley (3–0) || Cabrera (1–2) || Rodríguez (11) || Angel Stadium of Anaheim || 40,007 || 18–16 || style="background-color:#bbffbb;" | +½
|- style="background-color:#bbffbb"
| 35 || May 10 || Indians || 8–0 || Escobar (4–1) || Sowers (0–3) || || Angel Stadium of Anaheim || 33,698 || 19–16 || style="background-color:#bbffbb;" | +1
|- style="background-color:#bbffbb"
| 36 || May 11 || @ Rangers || 6–3 || Lackey (5–3) || Padilla (1–5) || Shields (3) || Ameriquest Field in Arlington || 30,782 || 20–16 || style="background-color:#bbffbb;" | +1
|- style="background-color:#bbffbb"
| 37 || May 12 || @ Rangers || 6–3 || Colón (4–0) || Loe (1–3) || Rodríguez (12) || Ameriquest Field in Arlington || 36,474 || 21–16 || style="background-color:#bbffbb;" | +2
|- style="background-color:#ffbbbb"
| 38 || May 13 || @ Rangers || 7–6 || Gagné (1–0) || Shields (0–2) || || Ameriquest Field in Arlington || 24,847 || 21–17 || style="background-color:#bbffbb;" | +1
|- style="background-color:#bbffbb"
| 39 || May 14 || @ Rangers || 7–2 || Weaver (2–3) || Millwood (2–4) || || Ameriquest Field in Arlington || 23,421 || 22–17 || style="background-color:#bbffbb;" | +2
|- style="background-color:#ffbbbb"
| 40 || May 15 || @ Mariners || 11–3 || White (1–0) || Escobar (4–2) || || Safeco Field || 21,769 || 22–18 || style="background-color:#bbffbb;" | +1
|- style="background-color:#bbffbb"
| 41 || May 16 || @ Mariners || 5–0 || Lackey (6–3) || Baek (1–1) || || Safeco Field || 22,331 || 23–18 || style="background-color:#bbffbb;" | +2
|- style="background-color:#bbffbb"
| 42 || May 17 || @ Mariners || 7–3 || Colón (5–0) || Washburn (3–4) || || Safeco Field || 20,488 || 24–18 || style="background-color:#bbffbb;" | +3
|- style="background-color:#bbffbb"
| 43 || May 18 || Dodgers || 9–1 || Santana (3–5) || Penny (5–1) || || Angel Stadium of Anaheim || 44,342 || 25–18 || style="background-color:#bbffbb;" | +3
|- style="background-color:#bbffbb"
| 44 || May 19 || Dodgers || 6–2 || Weaver (3–3) || Hendrickson (2–1) || || Angel Stadium of Anaheim || 44,380 || 26–18 || style="background-color:#bbffbb;" | +3
|- style="background-color:#bbffbb"
| 45 || May 20 || Dodgers || 4–1 || Escobar (5–2) || Lowe (4–5) || Rodríguez (13) || Angel Stadium of Anaheim || 44,301 || 27–18 || style="background-color:#bbffbb;" | +4
|- style="background-color:#bbffbb"
| 46 || May 22 || @ Tigers || 6–3 || Lackey (7–3) || Maroth (3–1) || Rodríguez (14) || Comerica Park || 28,678 || 28–18 || style="background-color:#bbffbb;" | +5½
|- style="background-color:#ffbbbb"
| 47 || May 23 || @ Tigers || 8–7 || Durbin (4–1) || Colón (5–1) || Jones (15) || Comerica Park || 28,105 || 28–19 || style="background-color:#bbffbb;" | +4½
|- style="background-color:#ffbbbb"
| 48 || May 24 || @ Tigers || 12–0 || Bonderman (3–0) || Santana (3–6) || || Comerica Park || 36,048 || 28–20 || style="background-color:#bbffbb;" | +4
|- style="background-color:#bbffbb"
| 49 || May 25 || @ Yankees || 10–6 || Weaver (4–3) || Clippard (1–1) || || Yankee Stadium || 50,363 || 29–20 || style="background-color:#bbffbb;" | +4
|- style="background-color:#bbffbb"
| 50 || May 26 || @ Yankeess || 3–1 || Escobar (6–2) || Wang (3–4) || Rodríguez (15) || Yankee Stadium || 52,536 || 30–20 || style="background-color:#bbffbb;" | +4½
|- style="background-color:#bbffbb"
| 51 || May 27 || @ Yankees || 4–3 || Lackey (8–3) || Proctor (0–2) || Rodríguez (16) || Yankee Stadium || 53,508 || 31–20 || style="background-color:#bbffbb;" | +4½
|- style="background-color:#ffbbbb"
| 52 || May 28 || Mariners || 12–5 || Batista (5–4)  || Colón (5–2) ||  || Angel Stadium of Anaheim || 42,352 || 31–21 || style="background-color:#bbffbb;" | +3½
|- style="background-color:#bbffbb"
| 53 || May 29 || Mariners || 4–1 || Santana (4–6) || Feierabend (0–1) || Rodríguez (17) || Angel Stadium of Anaheim || 38,174 || 32–21 || style="background-color:#bbffbb;" | +4½
|- style="background-color:#bbffbb"
| 54 || May 30 || Mariners || 8–6 || Moseley (4–0) || Hernández (3–3) || Rodríguez (18) || Angel Stadium of Anaheim || 39,288 || 33–21 || style="background-color:#bbffbb;" | +5½
|- style="background-color:#ffbbbb"
| 55 || May 31 || Orioles || 6–2 || Burres (3–2) || Escobar (6–3) || || Oriole Park at Camden Yards || 42,266 || 33–22 || style="background-color:#bbffbb;" | +4½

! style="background-color:#DDDDFF" width="160px" | Stadium
! style="background-color:#DDDDFF" width="71px" | Attendance
! style="background-color:#DDDDFF" width="53px" | Record
! style="background-color:#DDDDFF" width="42px" | GB
|- style="background-color:#bbffbb"
| 56 || June 1 || Orioles || 3–2 || Lackey (9–3) || Cabrera (4–6) || Rodríguez (19) || Angel Stadium of Anaheim || 43,012 || 34–22 || style="background-color:#bbffbb;" | +5½
|- style="background-color:#bbffbb"
| 57 || June 2 || Orioles || 7–4 || Saunders (3–0) || Trachsel (4–4) || || Angel Stadium of Anaheim || 42,190 || 35–22 || style="background-color:#bbffbb;" | +5½
|- style="background-color:#bbffbb"
| 58 || June 3 || Orioles || 4–3 || Bootcheck (1–0) || Ray (3–4) || || Angel Stadium of Anaheim || 41,026 || 36–22 || style="background-color:#bbffbb;" | +5½
|- style="background-color:#bbffbb"
| 59 || June 4 || Twins || 16–3 || Weaver (5–3) || Bonser (4–2) || || Angel Stadium of Anaheim || 37,380 || 37–22 || style="background-color:#bbffbb;" | +5½
|- style="background-color:#bbffbb"
| 60 || June 5 || Twins || 5–1 || Escobar (7–3) || Baker (1–1) || || Angel Stadium of Anaheim || 42,001 || 38–22 || style="background-color:#bbffbb;" | +5½
|- style="background-color:#ffbbbb"
| 61 || June 6 || Twins || 8–5 || Slowey (1–0) || Lackey (9–4) || Nathan (13) || Angel Stadium of Anaheim || 36,453 || 38–23 || style="background-color:#bbffbb;" | +5½
|- style="background-color:#bbffbb"
| 62 || June 8 || @ Cardinals || 10–6 || Carrasco (1–1) || Johnson (1–1) || || Busch Stadium || 44,156 || 39–23 || style="background-color:#bbffbb;" | +5½
|- style="background-color:#bbffbb"
| 63 || June 9 || @ Cardinals || 9–3 || Santana (5–6) || Looper (6–5) || || Busch Stadium || 45,392 || 40–23 || style="background-color:#bbffbb;" | +5½
|- style="background-color:#ffbbbb"
| 64 || June 10 || @ Cardinals || 9–6 || Wellemeyer (2–1) || Bootcheck (1–1) || || Busch Stadium || 43,612 || 40–24 || style="background-color:#bbffbb;" | +4½
|- style="background-color:#ffbbbb"
| 65 || June 12 || @ Reds || 5–3 || Coutlangus (3–1) || Moseley (4–1) || Weathers (13) || Great American Ball Park || 23,153 || 40–25 || style="background-color:#bbffbb;" | +3
|- style="background-color:#bbffbb"
| 66 || June 13 || @ Reds || 6–3 || Lackey (10–4) || Lohse (3–8) || Rodríguez (20) || Great American Ball Park || 29,655 || 41–25 || style="background-color:#bbffbb;" | +4
|- style="background-color:#bbffbb"
| 67 || June 14 || @ Reds || 9–7 || Colón (6–2) || Majewski (0–1) || Rodríguez (21) || Great American Ball Park || 32,860 || 42–25 || style="background-color:#bbffbb;" | +5
|- style="background-color:#ffbbbb"
| 68 || June 15 || @ Dodgers || 2–1 || Lowe (7–6) || Santana (5–7) || Saito (19) || Dodger Stadium || 56,000 || 42–26 || style="background-color:#bbffbb;" | +4
|- style="background-color:#bbffbb"
| 69 || June 16 || @ Dodgers || 3–0 || Weaver (6–3) || Schmidt (1–4) || Rodríguez (22) || Dodger Stadium || 56,000 || 43–26 || style="background-color:#bbffbb;" | +5
|- style="background-color:#bbffbb"
| 70 || June 17 || @ Dodgers || 10–4 || Escobar (8–3) || Wolf (8–5) || || Dodger Stadium || 56,000 || 44–26 || style="background-color:#bbffbb;" | +6
|- style="background-color:#bbffbb"
| 71 || June 18 || Astros || 10–9 || Rodríguez (1–2) || Borkowski (1–1) || || Angel Stadium of Anaheim || 42,232 || 45–26 || style="background-color:#bbffbb;" | +6
|- style="background-color:#ffbbbb"
| 72 || June 19 || Astros ||  9–5 || Jennings (1–1) || Colón (6–3) || || Angel Stadium of Anaheim || 42,156 || 45–27 || style="background-color:#bbffbb;" | +6
|- style="background-color:#bbffbb"
| 73 || June 20 || Astros || 8–4 || Carrasco (2–1) || Borkowski (1–2) || || Angel Stadium of Anaheim || 40,761 || 46–27 || style="background-color:#bbffbb;" | +6
|- style="background-color:#bbffbb"
| 74 || June 22 || Pirates || 5–4  || Shields (1–2) || Bayliss (4–3) || || Angel Stadium of Anaheim || 43,545 || 47–27 || style="background-color:#bbffbb;" | +7
|- style="background-color:#bbffbb"
| 75 || June 23 || Pirates || 10–1 || Escobar (9–3) || Snell (6–5) || || Angel Stadium of Anaheim || 44,010 || 48–27 || style="background-color:#bbffbb;" | +8
|- style="background-color:#bbffbb"
| 76 || June 24 || Pirates || 4–3  || Bootcheck (2–1) || Capps (3–4) || || Angel Stadium of Anaheim || 42,346 || 49–27 || style="background-color:#bbffbb;" | +8
|- style="background-color:#ffbbbb"
| 77 || June 25 || Royals || 5–3 || Thomson (1–0) || Lackey (10–5) || Dotel (7) || Angel Stadium of Anaheim || 43,895 || 49–28 || style="background-color:#bbffbb;" | +7
|- style="background-color:#ffbbbb"
| 78 || June 26 || Royals || 12–4 || Meche (5–6) || Santana (5–8) || || Angel Stadium of Anaheim || 44,002 || 49–29 || style="background-color:#bbffbb;" | +6
|- style="background-color:#ffbbbb"
| 79 || June 27 || Royals || 1–0 || de la Rosa (5–9) || Weaver (6–4) || Dotel (8) || Angel Stadium of Anaheim || 41,269 || 49–30 || style="background-color:#bbffbb;" | +5
|- style="background-color:#bbffbb"
| 80 || June 29 || @ Orioles || 9–7 || Shields (2–2) || Ray (4–6) || Rodríguez (23) || Oriole Park at Camden Yards || 36,689 || 50–30 || style="background-color:#bbffbb;" | +5
|- style="background-color:#ffbbbb"
| 81 || June 30 || @ Orioles || 6–3 || Burres (4–2) || Colón (6–4) || Shuey (1) || Oriole Park at Camden Yards || 26,235 || 50–31 || style="background-color:#bbffbb;" | +4

! style="background-color:#DDDDFF" width="160px" | Stadium
! style="background-color:#DDDDFF" width="71px" | Attendance
! style="background-color:#DDDDFF" width="53px" | Record
! style="background-color:#DDDDFF" width="42px" | GB
|- style="background-color:#bbffbb"
| 82 || July 1 || @ Orioles || 4–3 || Lackey (11–6) || Guthrie (4–2) || Rodríguez (24) || Oriole Park at Camden Yards || 25,058 || 51–31 || style="background-color:#bbffbb;" | +4
|- style="background-color:#ffbbbb"
| 83 || July 3 || @ Rangers || 8–3 || Millwood (5–7) || Santana (5–9) || || Ameriquest Field in Arlington || 24,871 || 51–32 || style="background-color:#bbffbb;" | +4½
|- style="background-color:#ffbbbb"
| 84 || July 4 || @ Rangers || 4–2 || Wright (2–2) || Weaver (6–5) || Gagné (11) || Ameriquest Field in Arlington || 46,105 || 51–33 || style="background-color:#bbffbb;" | +3½
|- style="background-color:#bbffbb"
| 85 || July 5 || @ Rangers || 5–2 || Escobar (10–3) || Tejeda (5–8) || || Ameriquest Field in Arlington || 22,062 || 52–33 || style="background-color:#bbffbb;" | +4½
|- style="background-color:#ffbbbb"
| 86 || July 6 || @ Yankees || 14–9 || Ramírez (1–0) || Bootcheck (2–2) || || Yankee Stadium || 52,059 || 52–34 || style="background-color:#bbffbb;" | +3½
|- style="background-color:#bbffbb"
| 87 || July 7 || @ Yankees || 2–1  || Rodríguez (2–2) || Vizcaíno (4–2) || || Yankee Stadium || 54,497 || 53–34 || style="background-color:#bbffbb;" | +3½
|- style="background-color:#ffbbbb"
| 88 || July 8 || @ Yankees || 12–0 || Wang (9–4) || Santana (5–10) || || Yankee Stadium || 53,921 || 53–35 || style="background-color:#bbffbb;" | +2½
|- style="background-color:#bbcaff"
|colspan=4 style="background-color:#bbcaff" | July 10: All-Star Game  || Beckett  || Young  || Rodríguez  || AT&T Park || 43,965 || colspan=2 | San Francisco
|- style="background-color:#bbffbb"
| 89 || July 13 || Rangers || 2–1 || Rodríguez (3–2) || Benoit (3–3) || || Angel Stadium of Anaheim || 44,100 || 54–35 || style="background-color:#bbffbb;" | +3
|- style="background-color:#bbffbb"
| 90 || July 14 || Rangers || 9–5 || Lackey (12–5) || Loe (5–7) || || Angel Stadium of Anaheim || 44,026 || 55–35 || style="background-color:#bbffbb;" | +3
|- style="background-color:#ffbbbb"
| 91 || July 15 || Rangers || 5–4  || Wilson (1–1) || Speier (0–1) || Gagné (13) || Angel Stadium of Anaheim || 44,068 || 55–36 || style="background-color:#bbffbb;" | +3
|- style="background-color:#ffbbbb"
| 92 || July 17 || @ Devil Rays || 8–3 || Shields (8–5) || Santana (5–11) || || Tropicana Field || 9,430 || 55–37 || style="background-color:#bbffbb;" | +2½
|- style="background-color:#ffbbbb"
| 93 || July 18 || @ Devil Rays || 7–2 || Kazmir (7–6) || Colón (6–5) || || Tropicana Field || 13,521 || 55–38 || style="background-color:#bbffbb;" | +1½
|- style="background-color:#bbffbb"
| 94 || July 19 || @ Devil Rays || 3–0 || Escobar (11–3) || Sonnanstine (1–5) || Rodríguez (25) || Tropicana Field || 18,163 || 56–38 || style="background-color:#bbffbb;" | +2
|- style="background-color:#ffbbbb"
| 95 || July 20 || @ Twins || 7–5 || Silva (8–10) || Lackey (12–6) || Nathan (19) || HHH Metrodome || 35,794 || 56–39 || style="background-color:#bbffbb;" | +1
|- style="background-color:#ffbbbb"
| 96 || July 21 || @ Twins || 5–2 || Neshek (5–1) || Shields (2–3) || Nathan (20) || HHH Metrodome || 33,868 || 56–40 || style="background-color:#bbffbb;" | +1
|- style="background-color:#bbffbb"
| 97 || July 22 || @ Twins || 7–2 || Saunders (4–0) || Garza (1–2) || || HHH Metrodome || 33,217 || 57–40 || style="background-color:#bbffbb;" | +2
|- style="background-color:#ffbbbb"
| 98 || July 23 || Athletics || 12–6 || Kennedy (3–8) || Colón (6–6)|| || Angel Stadium of Anaheim || 43,847 || 57–41 || style="background-color:#bbffbb;" | +2
|- style="background-color:#ffbbbb"
| 99 || July 24 || Athletics || 4–3 || DiNardo (5–6) || Escobar (11–4) || Embree (11) || Angel Stadium of Anaheim || 43,784 || 57–42 || style="background-color:#bbffbb;" | +2½
|- style="background-color:#bbffbb"
| 100 || July 25 || Athletics || 7–6 || Rodríguez (4–2) || Kennedy (3–9) || || Angel Stadium of Anaheim || 44,252 || 58–42 || style="background-color:#bbffbb;" | +3½
|- style="background-color:#bbffbb"
| 101 || July 27 || Tigers || 11–6 || Weaver (7–5) || Robertson (6–8) || || Angel Stadium of Anaheim || 44,042 || 59–42 || style="background-color:#bbffbb;" | +4
|- style="background-color:#bbffbb"
| 102 || July 28 || Tigers || 10–3 || Shields (3–3) || Grilli (5–3) || || Angel Stadium of Anaheim || 43,122 || 60–42 || style="background-color:#bbffbb;" | +4
|- style="background-color:#bbffbb"
| 103 || July 29 || Tigers || 13–4 || Bootcheck (3–2) || Bonderman (10–3) || || Angel Stadium of Anaheim || 44,019 || 61–42 || style="background-color:#bbffbb;" | +4
|- style="background-color:#ffbbbb"
| 104 || July 30 || @ Mariners || 2–0 || Batista (11–7) || Escobar (11–5) || Putz (31) || Safeco Field || 31,232 || 61–43 || style="background-color:#bbffbb;" | +3
|- style="background-color:#bbffbb"
| 105 || July 31|| @ Mariners || 8–0 || Lackey (13–6) || Weaver, Jeff (2–10) || || Safeco Field || 28,903 || 62–43 || style="background-color:#bbffbb;" | +4

! style="background-color:#DDDDFF" width="160px" | Stadium
! style="background-color:#DDDDFF" width="71px" | Attendance
! style="background-color:#DDDDFF" width="53px" | Record
! style="background-color:#DDDDFF" width="42px" | GB
|- style="background-color:#ffbbbb"
| 106 || August 1 || @ Mariners || 8–7  || O'Flaherty (7–0) || Speier (0–2) || || Safeco Field || 34,471 || 62–44 || style="background-color:#bbffbb;" | +3
|- style="background-color:#bbffbb"
| 107 || August 2 || @ Athletics || 6–4 || Saunders (5–0) || Gaudin (8–7) || Rodríguez (26) || McAfee Coliseum || 21,654 || 63–44 || style="background-color:#bbffbb;" | +3½
|- style="background-color:#ffbbbb"
| 108 || August 3 || @ Athletics || 8–4 || Casilla (3–1) || Shields (3–4) || || McAfee Coliseum || 21,552 || 63–45 || style="background-color:#bbffbb;" | +2½
|- style="background-color:#ffbbbb"
| 109 || August 4 || @ Athletics || 2–1 || Blanton (9–8) || Escobar (11–6) || Embree (13) || McAfee Coliseum || 29,144 || 63–46 || style="background-color:#bbffbb;" | +2½
|- style="background-color:#bbffbb"
| 110 || August 5 || @ Athletics || 4–3 || Lackey (14–6) || Calero (1–5) || Rodríguez (27) || McAfee Coliseum || 26,782 || 64–46 || style="background-color:#bbffbb;" | +3½
|- style="background-color:#bbffbb"
| 111 || August 6 || Red Sox || 4–2 || Speier (1–2) || Schilling (6–5) || Rodríguez (28) || Angel Stadium of Anaheim || 44,142 || 65–46 || style="background-color:#bbffbb;" | +4
|- style="background-color:#bbffbb"
| 112 || August 7 || Red Sox || 10–4 ||  Saunders (6–0) || Wakefield (13–10) || || Angel Stadium of Anaheim || 44,177 || 66–46 || style="background-color:#bbffbb;" | +4
|- style="background-color:#ffbbbb"
| 113 || August 8 || Red Sox || 9–6 || Okajima (3–0) || Speier (1–3) || Papelbon (26) || Angel Stadium of Anaheim || 44,243 || 66–47 || style="background-color:#bbffbb;" | +3
|- style="background-color:#bbffbb"
| 114 || August 10 || Twins || 10–1 || Escobar (12–6) || Baker (6–5) || || Angel Stadium of Anaheim || 43,810 || 67–47 || style="background-color:#bbffbb;" | +3½
|- style="background-color:#bbffbb"
| 115 || August 11 || Twins || 4–3 || Lackey (15–6) || Neshek (6–2) || Rodríguez (29) || Angel Stadium of Anaheim || 44,064 || 68–47 || style="background-color:#bbffbb;" | +3½
|- style="background-color:#bbffbb"
| 116 || August 12 || Twins || 6–2 || Weaver (8–5) || Bonser (5–9) || || Angel Stadium of Anaheim || 43,911 || 69–47 || style="background-color:#bbffbb;" | +3½
|- style="background-color:#ffbbbb"
| 117 || August 14 || @ Blue Jays || 4–1 || Halladay (14–5) || Saunders (6–1) || || Rogers Centre || 31,978 || 69–48 || style="background-color:#bbffbb;" | +3
|- style="background-color:#ffbbbb"
| 118 || August 15 || @ Blue Jays || 2–1 || Marcum (10–4) || Moseley (4–2) || Accardo (23) || Rogers Centre || 30,353 || 69–49 || style="background-color:#bbffbb;" | +3
|- style="background-color:#bbffbb"
| 119 || August 16 || @ Blue Jays || 4–3 || Escobar (13–6) || McGowan (8–7)  || Rodríguez (30) || Rogers Centre || 27,861 || 70–49 || style="background-color:#bbffbb;" | +3½
|- style="background-color:#ffbbbb"
| 120 || August 17 || @ Red Sox || 8–4 || Buchholz (1–0) || Lackey (15–7) || Papelbon (29) || Fenway Park || 36,686 || 70–50 || style="background-color:#bbffbb;" | +3
|- style="background-color:#bbffbb"
| 121 || August 17 || @ Red Sox || 7–5 || Rodríguez (5–2) || Gagné (3–1) || || Fenway Park || 36,538 || 71–50 || style="background-color:#bbffbb;" | +3
|- style="background-color:#ffbbbb"
| 122 || August 18 || @ Red Sox || 10–5 || Schilling (7–5) || Weaver (8–6) || || Fenway Park || 36,652 || 71–51 || style="background-color:#bbffbb;" | +2
|- style="background-color:#bbffbb"
| 123 || August 19 || @ Red Sox || 3–1 || Saunders (7–1) || Tavárez (6–9) || Rodríguez (31) || Fenway Park || 36,346 || 72–51 || style="background-color:#bbffbb;" | +2
|- style="background-color:#bbffbb"
| 124 || August 20 || Yankees || 7–6 || Oliver (1–0) || Henn (2–1) || || Angel Stadium of Anaheim || 44,249 || 73–51 || style="background-color:#bbffbb;" | +2
|- style="background-color:#bbffbb"
| 125 || August 21 || Yankees || 18–9 || Escobar (14–6) || Mussina (8–9) || Gwyn (1) || Angel Stadium of Anaheim || 44,264 || 74–51 || style="background-color:#bbffbb;" | +2
|- style="background-color:#ffbbbb"
| 126 || August 22 || Yankees || 8–2 || Pettitte (11–7) || Lackey (15–8) || || Angel Stadium of Anaheim || 44,326 || 74–52 || style="background-color:#bbffbb;" | +2
|- style="background-color:#ffbbbb"
| 127 || August 23 || Blue Jays || 5–4 || Litsch (5–6) || Santana (5–12) || Accardo (25) || Angel Stadium of Anaheim || 41,009 || 74–53 || style="background-color:#bbffbb;" | +1
|- style="background-color:#bbffbb"
| 128 || August 24 || Blue Jays || 3–0 || Weaver (9–6) || Halladay (14–6) || Rodríguez (32) || Angel Stadium of Anaheim || 41,131 || 75–53 || style="background-color:#bbffbb;" | +1
|- style="background-color:#ffbbbb"
| 129 || August 25 || Blue Jays || 9–2 || Marcum (11–5) || Saunders (7–2) || || Angel Stadium of Anaheim || 41,631 || 75–54 || style="background-color:#bbffbb;" | +1
|- style="background-color:#bbffbb"
| 130 || August 26 || Blue Jays || 3–1 || Escobar (15–6) || McGowan (8–8) || Rodríguez (33) || Angel Stadium of Anaheim || 40,565 || 76–54 || style="background-color:#bbffbb;" | +2
|- style="background-color:#bbffbb"
| 131 || August 27 || @ Mariners || 6–0 || Lackey (16–8) || Batista (13–10) || || Safeco Field || 45,998 || 77–54 || style="background-color:#bbffbb;" | +3
|- style="background-color:#bbffbb"
| 132 || August 28 || @ Mariners || 10–6 || Speier (2–3) || Morrow (3–3) || || Safeco Field || 44,395 || 78–54 || style="background-color:#bbffbb;" | +4
|- style="background-color:#bbffbb"
| 133 || August 29 || @ Mariners || 8–2 || Weaver (10–6) || Hernández (10–7) || || Safeco Field || 46,047 || 79–54 || style="background-color:#bbffbb;" | +5
|- style="background-color:#bbffbb"
| 134 || August 31 || Rangers || 7–6  || Oliver (2–0) || Francisco (1–1) || || Angel Stadium of Anaheim || 41,012 || 80–54 || style="background-color:#bbffbb;" | +6½

! style="background-color:#DDDDFF" width="160px" | Stadium
! style="background-color:#DDDDFF" width="71px" | Attendance
! style="background-color:#DDDDFF" width="53px" | Record
! style="background-color:#DDDDFF" width="42px" | GB
|- style="background-color:#ffbbbb"
| 135 || September 1 || Rangers || 7–6 || Vólquez (1–0) || Escobar (15–7) || Wilson (9) || Angel Stadium of Anaheim || 38,342 || 80–55 || style="background-color:#bbffbb;" | +6½
|- style="background-color:#ffbbbb"
| 136 || September 2 || Rangers || 8–7 || Littleton (3–1) || Shields (3–5) || Wilson (10) || Angel Stadium of Anaheim || 40,635 || 80–56 || style="background-color:#bbffbb;" | +6½
|- style="background-color:#bbffbb"
| 137 || September 3 || Athletics || 9–5 || Santana (6–12) || Gaudin (10–10) || || Angel Stadium of Anaheim || 39,164 || 81–56 || style="background-color:#bbffbb;" | +6½
|- style="background-color:#bbffbb"
| 138 || September 4 || Athletics || 4–3 || Weaver (11–6) || DiNardo (8–8) || Rodríguez (34) || Angel Stadium of Anaheim || 39,017 || 82–56 || style="background-color:#bbffbb;" | +7½
|- style="background-color:#ffbbbb"
| 139 || September 5 || Athletics || 6–2 || Blanton (12–9) || Saunders (7–3) || || Angel Stadium of Anaheim || 34,000 || 82–57 || style="background-color:#bbffbb;" | +7½
|- style="background-color:#bbffbb"
| 140 || September 6 || Indians || 10–3 || Escobar (16–7) || Byrd (14–6) || || Angel Stadium of Anaheim || 41,720 || 83–57 || style="background-color:#bbffbb;" | +8
|- style="background-color:#bbffbb"
| 141 || September 7 || Indians || 3–2  || Shields (4–5) || Betancourt (4–1) || || Angel Stadium of Anaheim || 40,020 || 84–57 || style="background-color:#bbffbb;" | +9
|- style="background-color:#ffbbbb"
| 142 || September 8 || Indians || 6–1 || Sabathia (17–7) || Santana (6–13) || || Angel Stadium of Anaheim || 43,544 || 84–58 || style="background-color:#bbffbb;" | +9
|- style="background-color:#ffbbbb"
| 143 || September 9 || Indians || 6–2 || Laffey (3–1) || Weaver (11–7) || || Angel Stadium of Anaheim || 40,037 || 84–59 || style="background-color:#bbffbb;" | +8
|- style="background-color:#bbffbb"
| 144 || September 11 || @ Orioles || 10–5 || Saunders (8–3) || Santos (1–5) || || Oriole Park at Camden Yards || 15,371 || 85–59 || style="background-color:#bbffbb;" | +9½
|- style="background-color:#bbffbb"
| 145 || September 12 || @ Orioles || 18–6 || Escobar (17–7) || Cabrera (9–16) || || Oriole Park at Camden Yards || 15,136 || 86–59 || style="background-color:#bbffbb;" | +9½
|- style="background-color:#ffbbbb"
| 146 || September 13 || @ Orioles || 3–0 || Leicester (2–1) || Lackey (16–9) || Walker (5) || Oriole Park at Camden Yards || 16,359 || 86–60 || style="background-color:#bbffbb;" | +8½
|- style="background-color:#ffbbbb"
| 147 || September 14 || @ White Sox || 5–3 || Contreras (9–16) || Colón (6–7) || Jenks (38) || U.S. Cellular Field || 33,581 || 86–61 || style="background-color:#bbffbb;" | +7½
|- style="background-color:#bbffbb"
| 148 || September 15 || @ White Sox || 2–1 || Weaver (12–7) || Garland (9–12) || Rodríguez (35) || U.S. Cellular Field || 36,485 || 87–61 || style="background-color:#bbffbb;" | +8½
|- style="background-color:#ffbbbb"
| 149 || September 16 || @ White Sox || 9–7 || MacDougal (2–5) || Moseley (4–3) || || U.S. Cellular Field || 29,010 || 87–62 || style="background-color:#bbffbb;" | +8½
|- style="background-color:#bbffbb"
| 150 || September 17 || Devil Rays || 10–7 || Oliver (3–0) || Jackson (4–15) || || Angel Stadium of Anaheim || 37,530 || 88–62 || style="background-color:#bbffbb;" | +8½
|- style="background-color:#bbffbb"
| 151 || September 18 || Devil Rays || 2–1 || Lackey (17–9) || Hammel (2–5) || Rodríguez (36) || Angel Stadium of Anaheim || 36,313 || 89–62 || style="background-color:#bbffbb;" | +8½
|- style="background-color:#bbffbb"
| 152 || September 19 || Devil Rays || 2–1 || Santana (7–13) || Howell (1–5) || Rodríguez (37) || Angel Stadium of Anaheim || 33,699 || 90–62 || style="background-color:#bbffbb;" | +8½
|- style="background-color:#bbffbb"
| 153 || September 20 || Mariners || 9–5 || Weaver (13–7) || Feierabend (1–5) || || Angel Stadium of Anaheim || 40,016 || 91–62 || style="background-color:#bbffbb;" | +9½
|- style="background-color:#ffbbbb"
| 154 || September 21 || Mariners || 6–0 || Washburn (10–15) || Saunders (8–4) || || Angel Stadium of Anaheim || 44,018 || 91–63 || style="background-color:#bbffbb;" | +8½
|- style="background-color:#ffbbbb"
| 155 || September 22 || Mariners || 3–2 || Batista (15–11) || Colón (6–8) || Putz (39) || Angel Stadium of Anaheim || 43,583 || 91–64 || style="background-color:#bbffbb;" | +7½
|- style="background-color:#bbffbb"
| 156 || y-September 23 || Mariners || 7–4 || Lackey (18–9) || Weaver, Jeff (7–13) || Rodríguez (38) || Angel Stadium of Anaheim || 44,234 || 92–64 || style="background-color:#bbffbb;" | +8½
|- style="background-color:#ffbbbb"
| 157 || September 24 || @ Rangers || 8–7 || White (2–0) || Santana (7–14) || Littleton (2) || Ameriquest Field in Arlington || 22,881 || 92–65 || style="background-color:#bbffbb;" | +8
|- style="background-color:#ffbbbb"
| 158 || September 25 || @ Rangers || 3–1 || Wright (4–5) || Oliver (3–1) || || Ameriquest Field in Arlington || 30,708 || 92–66 || style="background-color:#bbffbb;" | +8
|- style="background-color:#ffbbbb"
| 159 || September 26 || @ Rangers || 16–2 || Rheinecker (4–3) || Saunders (8–4) || || Ameriquest Field in Arlington || 24,223 || 92–67 || style="background-color:#bbffbb;" | +7½
|- style="background-color:#bbffbb"
| 160 || September 28 || @ Athletics || 2–0 || Lackey (19–9) || Haren (15–9) || Rodríguez (39) || McAfee Coliseum || 32,287 || 93–67 || style="background-color:#bbffbb;" | +7
|- style="background-color:#bbffbb"
| 161 || September 29 || @ Athletics || 3–2 || Escobar (18–7) || DiNardo (8–10) || Rodríguez (40) || McAfee Coliseum || 26,480 || 94–67 || style="background-color:#bbffbb;" | +7
|- style="background-color:#ffbbbb"
| 162 || September 30 || @ Athletics || 3–2 || Street (5–2) || Bootcheck (3–3) || || McAfee Coliseum || 28,062 || 94–68 || style="background-color:#bbffbb;" | +6

Playoffs

|- bgcolor="ffbbbb"
| 1 || October 3 || @ Red Sox || 4–0 || Beckett (1–0) || Lackey (0–1) || || Fenway Park || 37,597 || 0–1 ||
|- bgcolor="ffbbbb"  
| 2 || October 5 || @ Red Sox || 6–3 || Papelbon (1–0) || Speier (0–1) || || Fenway Park || 37,706 || 0–2 ||
|- bgcolor="ffbbbb"
| 3 || October 7 || Red Sox || 9–1 || Schilling (1–0) || Weaver (0–1) || || Angel Stadium of Anaheim || 45,262 || 0–3 ||

Team statistical leaders

Stats as of September 30, 2007

Player stats

Batting
Note: G = Games played; AB = At bats; R = Runs; H = Hits; 2B = Doubles; 3B = Triples; HR = Home runs; RBI = Runs batted in; SB = Stolen bases; BB = Walks; AVG = Batting average; SLG = Slugging average

Source:

Pitching
Note: W = Wins; L = Losses; ERA = Earned run average; G = Games pitched; GS = Games started; SV = Saves; IP = Innings pitched; H = Hits allowed; R = Runs allowed; ER = Earned runs allowed; BB = Walks allowed; SO = Strikeouts

Source:

Awards
 Vladimir Guerrero – 2007 AL All-Star/2007 Home Run Derby Champion
 John Lackey – 2007 AL All-Star
 Francisco Rodríguez – 2007 AL All-Star

Farm system

LEAGUE CHAMPIONS: Orem

References

External links

Game Logs:
1st Half: Los Angeles Angels of Anaheim Game Log on ESPN.com
2nd Half: Los Angeles Angels of Anaheim Game Log on ESPN.com
Batting Statistics: Los Angeles Angels of Anaheim Batting Stats on ESPN.com
Pitching Statistics: Los Angeles Angels of Anaheim Pitching Stats on ESPN.com

2007 Los Angeles Angels of Anaheim at Baseball Reference

American League West champion seasons
Los Angeles Angels seasons
Los Angeles Angels of Anaheim season
Los